Lake Dexter may refer to:

Lake Dexter (Polk County, Florida)
Lake Dexter (Wisconsin)

See also
Dexter Reservoir